The siege of Corfu (October 1798 – March 1799) was a military operation by a joint Russian and Turkish fleet against French troops occupying the island of Corfu.

Background

By the Treaty of Campo Formio (November 1797) and the dissolution of the Republic of Venice, the Ionian Islands were ceded to the French Republic, which occupied Corfu as the département Corcyre.

In 1798, Admiral Fyodor Ushakov was sent to the Mediterranean in command of a joint Russian-Turkish squadron to support General Alexander Suvorov's upcoming Italian and Swiss expedition (1799–1800). One of Ushakov's main tasks was to take the strategically important Ionian Islands from the French. In October 1798 the French garrisons were driven from Cythera, Zakynthos, Cephalonia, and Lefkada. It remained to take the largest and best-fortified island of the archipelago, Corfu.

French preparations

The city of Corfu is located on the east coast in the central part of the island between two forts:
 The medieval Old Fortress, on the eastern tip of the city, cut off from the city by an artificial moat;
 The more modern New Fortress, a huge complex of fortifications dominating the northeastern part of the city.

From the new to the old fort a high wall ran along the shore. The town was also covered by bastions on two mountains, Abraham and Salvatore, and the intermediate fort of San Rocco. From the sea, the city was protected by the well-fortified island of Vido, and the smaller island of Lazaretto, two miles up the coast, was also strengthened by the French.

The fortresses were not well maintained by the Ventians, and in parlous state. Of the  artillery pieces in the fortifications, only about 150 were capable of being used. The French also lacked provisions, which had to be hurriedly requisitioned from the local population. Urgent messages were sent to Italy, asking for reinforcements of 3,000 men, supplies and ammunition, the local government placed in the hands of a French commission, and on 22 October the population, whose loyalties were doubtful, was disarmed.

In the harbour was a French squadron of two ships of the line, the 74-gun Généreux and 54-gun Leander, the 20-gun corvette Brune, a bomb-vessel, a brig and four auxiliary vessels.

The siege of Corfu
On 4 November 1798 Ushakov's Russian-Turkish squadron, consisting of three ships of the line, three frigates and a number of small ships, began the siege of Corfu. They were joined shortly afterwards by a Turkish squadron and another Russian squadron under the command of Captain Dmitry Senyavin. Given the strong fortifications of the island and the lack of strength for a landing, it was initially decided to wait for Turkish reinforcements for a landing force. However, on the first day the French abandoned their fortifications on Lazaretto island, which the Russians immediately occupied.

On 13 November a small force of Russians landed without opposition and took the small port of Gouvia about five miles along the coast. From then on the Russians began building batteries and shelling the French-held forts. In December, another Russian squadron, this one under Rear-Admiral Pavel Pustoshkin, augmented the besieging forces. The combined fleet now consisted of 12 ships of the line, 11 frigates and many smaller vessels.

On the night of January 26 the Généreux, with her sails painted black, and the brig escaped from the harbour and sailed to Ancona.

In February, about 4,000 Ottoman troops arrived and it was decided to make a landing on the island of Vido – the key to the defense of Corfu – using naval artillery against its shore batteries.

Capture of Vido

The assault on Vido began early in the morning of 28 February 1799. After a four-hour bombardment by several ships, all five shore batteries on the island had been suppressed. The Leander and Brune tried to intervene but were damaged and forced to retreat to the protection of the batteries of Corfu. The allied fleet then landed over 2000 men on Vido and after a two-hour battle the island was taken. Of the 800 men defending the island, 200 were killed and 400 were taken prisoner, including the commandant of the island, Brigadier-General Pivron. About 150 men managed to swim to Corfu. Russian losses were 31 killed and 100 wounded. The Ottomans lost 180 killed and wounded.

Capture of Corfu city
After the fall of Vido, the key to Corfu was in the hands of Ushakov. On March 1 the captured batteries on the island opened fire on the city's forts, supported by the Russians' shore batteries and some of the Russian and Turkish warships. The allied forces stormed and captured the outlying forts of San Rocco, San Salvatore and San Abraham.

On 2 March Ushakov planned to assault the main forts, but in the morning the French sent envoys to request a forty-eight-hour armistice, and on 3 March they surrendered.

Aftermath
The capitulation agreed between the French and Russians was an honourable one, including a provision for the French troops to be conveyed to Toulon. The remaining French ships in the harbour were taken by the allies, including the Leander which had been captured from the Royal Navy on 18 August 1798; the Russians returned her to the British.

Admiral Ushakov was honoured by the Emperor of Russia with the star of the Order of St Alexander Nevsky and by the Ottoman Sultan with a chelengk, rarely awarded to non-Muslims.

The capture of Corfu completed the Russo-Turkish takeover of the Ionian Islands, which was of great military and political importance. The islands became the Seven Islands Republic, a temporary protectorate of Russia and Turkey, and for several years Corfu served as a base for the Russian Mediterranean fleet. Ushakov's fleet went on to support the allied attack on Naples.

Popular culture

In 1953, director Mikhail Romm made a cinematographic dramatization of the Russian conquest of the Ionian Islands called Корабли штурмуют бастионы (The Ships Storm the Bastions), the second of a two-part biographical epic about Admiral Ushakov. The movie was released by Mosfilm.

References

Sources 

 
 Jervis-White-Jervis, Henry, History of the island of Corfú and of the Republic of the Ionian islands, Colburn, London, 1852
 James, William M., The Naval History of Great Britain during the French Revolutionary Wars and Napoleonic Wars, volume 2, 1797–1799, first published 1822–24, reprinted by Conway Maritime Press, London, 2002

Siege 1798
Ionian Islands
Mediterranean campaign of 1798
Sieges involving France
Sieges involving Russia
Sieges involving the Ottoman Empire
Conflicts in 1798
Conflicts in 1799
French rule in the Ionian Islands (1797–1799)
18th century in Greece
1798 in the Ottoman Empire
1799 in the Ottoman Empire